Carl Lang (born 20 September 1957) is a French politician and former Member of the European Parliament for the North-West constituency. He was member of the National Front from 1978 to 2008; he is currently president and co-founder of the Party of France (Front National and Party of France are both classified by their opponents as a far-right party).

He was a member of the europarliamentary group "Identity Tradition and Sovereignty" (ITS) in the European Parliament until its dissolving in November 2007. Currently a Non-Inscrit, he is member of the Committee on Employment and Social Affairs.

Carl Lang is also a substitute for the Committee on Fisheries and the Committee on Industry, Research and Energy, a member of the delegation for relations with Belarus, and a substitute for the delegation to the EU–Romania Joint Parliamentary Committee.

Ahead of the 2009 European elections, he announced that he would run a dissident FN list against the official FN list led by Marine Le Pen in the North-West constituency.

Career
 State diploma as a masseur-physiotherapist (1980)
 Secretary-General of the National Front (1988–1995, 1998–2006)
 Member of the Nord-Pas-de-Calais Regional Council (since 1992)
 Member of the European Parliament (since 1994)

External links
 Carl Lang
 European Parliament biography

1957 births
Living people
People from Vernon, Eure
Politicians from Normandy
Party of France politicians
MEPs for North-West France 2004–2009
National Rally (France) MEPs
MEPs for North-West France 2009–2014
MEPs for France 1994–1999
National Rally (France) politicians
French people of German descent